Mugam is a folk musical composition from Azerbaijan.

Mugam may also refer to:

 Mugam (1999 film), a Tamil language film
 Mugam (upcoming film), an upcoming Tamil thriller film
 Mugam, Armenia, a town in Armavir Province, Armenia